Deandra van der Colff (born 31 May 1993 in Bulawayo, Zimbabwe) is a Botswanan swimmer.

She competed in the 50 m freestyle and 50 m butterfly events at the 2011 World Aquatics Championships and in the 50 m freestyle, 50 m breaststroke and 50 m butterfly events at the 2012 FINA World Swimming Championships (25 m). Van der Colff also competed in the 50 m and 50 m butterfly events at the 2013 World Aquatics Championships.

References

Living people
1993 births
Sportspeople from Bulawayo
Botswana female swimmers